Veronica Cooper (née Balfe; May 27, 1913 – February 16, 2000) was an American actress who appeared in The Gay Nighties and other films under the name Sandra Shaw. She was the wife of the actor Gary Cooper and mother of painter Maria Cooper Janis.

Early life
Veronica Balfe was born in Brooklyn to Veronica Gibbons and Harry Balfe, Jr. Following her parents' divorce, she lived in Paris with her mother. Balfe did not see her father for many years, but kept in touch with her grandfather, who owned a ranch in California. Balfe saw her father a few years before his death in the 1950s. Her mother married Paul Shields, a successful Wall Street financier.

Cooper graduated from the Todhunter School and the Bennett School in Millbrook, New York. While she was in school, she studied dramatics and participated in some amateur productions. An avid sportswoman, Cooper was known to her friends by the nickname, "Rocky."

Career
In 1933, she went to see her uncle, Cedric Gibbons, in Hollywood. She received a long-term contract with RKO after a screen test. She played parts in King Kong, Blood Money, and No Other Woman, as well as the sleepwalking countess in the Clark & McCullough comedy short The Gay Nighties (1933). She also played herself in Hedda Hopper's Hollywood No. 3 (1942), and appeared in a few television shows and documentaries.

Personal life

Balfe married actor Gary Cooper on December 15, 1933, at her mother's home at 778 Park Avenue, New York; the wedding had been planned for the Waldorf Astoria hotel, but the location was probably changed to avoid public attention.  In 1937, she gave birth to their daughter, Maria Veronica Cooper. They separated in 1951, and reconciled in 1953, remaining married until his death in 1961.

On June 27, 1964, she married plastic surgeon John Marquis Converse in Westport, Connecticut. She was an enthusiastic sportswoman and was the female California skeet champion in the 1930s. She also enjoyed golf, swimming, tennis, and scuba-diving.

She and her daughter were both devout Catholics.

Death

Balfe died in her home in Manhattan on February 16, 2000, aged 86.

Filmography

References

External links 
 

20th-century American actresses
American socialites
American film actresses
1913 births
2000 deaths
American Roman Catholics